Titanoceros malefica is a species of snout moth. It is found in India.

References

Moths described in 1934
Epipaschiinae